The second election to the Powys County Council following  local government reorganisation was held in May 1999. It was preceded by the 1995 election and followed by the 2004 election. The election resulted once again in a majority of Independent councillors.

Results Overview 
No Overall Control 
 

|}

Ward results (Brecknockshire)

Aber-craf (one seat)

Bronllys (one seat)
Boundary Change.

Builth (one seat)

Bwlch (one seat)

Crickhowell (one seat)
Boundary Change.

Cwmtwrch (one seat)

Felin-fach (one seat)

Gwernyfed (one seat)
No valid nominations were received.

Hay (one seat)

James Gibson-Watt represented a different ward on the previous council.

Llanafanfawr (one seat)

Llangattock (one seat)

Llangors (one seat)

Llangynidr (one seat)

Llanwrtyd Wells (one seat)

Maescar / Llywel (one seat)

St Davids Within (one seat)

St John (one seat)
The number of seats were reduced from two to one.

St Mary (one seat)
The number of seats were reduced from two to one.

Talgarth (one seat)
The number of seats were reduced from two to one.

Talybont-on-Usk (one seat)

Tawe Uchaf (one seat)

Ynyscedwyn (one seat)

Yscir (one seat)

Ystradgynlais (two seats)
The number of seats were reduced from two to one.

Ward results (Montgomeryshire)

Banwy (one seat)

Berriew (one seat)

Blaen Hafren (one seat)
The ward was previously known as Trefeglwys / Llangurig.

Caersws (one seat)

Churchstoke (one seat)

Dolforwyn (one seat)

Forden (one seat)

Glantwymyn (one seat)

Guilsfield (one seat)
Boundary Change. The wards of Guilsfield Within and Guilsfield Without were merged.

Kerry (one seat)

Llanbrynmair (one seat)

Llandinam (one seat)

Llandrinio (one seat)

Llandysilio (one seat)

Llanfair Caereinion (one seat)

Llanfihangel (one seat)

Llanfyllin (one seat)

Llanidloes (one seat)
The number of seats was reduced from two to one.

Llanrhaeadr-ym-Mochnant / Llansilin(one seat)
Labour won the seat in 1995 but subsequently lost it at a by-election

Llansantffraid (one seat)

Llanwddyn (one seat)

Machynlleth (one seat)

Meifod (one seat)

Montgomery (one seat)

Newtown Central (one seat)
The number of seats was reduced from two to one.

Newtown East (one seat)

Newtown Llanllwchaiaran North (one seat)

Newtown Llanllwchaiaran West

Newtown South (one seat)

Rhiwcynon (one seat)

Trewern (one seat)
The Conservative candidate had won the seat at a by-election.

Welshpool Castle (one seat)

Welshpool Gungrog (one seat)

Welshpool Llanerchyddol (one seat)

Ward results (Radnorshire)

Beguildy (one seat)

Disserth and Trecoed (one seat)
The sitting councilor had been elected as a Labour candidate in 1995.

Glasbury (one seat)

Knighton (one seat)
The number of seats was reduced from two to one.

Llanbadarn Fawr (one seat)

Llandrindod East/West (one seat)

Llandrindod North (one seat)

Llandrindod South (one seat)

Llanelwedd (one seat)

Llangunllo (one seat)

Llanyre (one seat)

Nantmel (one seat)

Old Radnor (one seat)

Presteigne (one seat)
The winning candidate was elected as an Independent in 1995.

Rhayader (one seat)

By-Elections 1999-2004

Gwernyfed by-election 1999
A by-election was held in Gwernyfed on 24 June 1999 after no valid nominations were received for the regular election.

Disserth and Tircoed by-election 1999
A by-election was held in Disserth and Tircoed on 18 November 1999 following the resignation of P.D. Speake.

Welshpool Gungrog by-election 2000
A by-election was held in the Welshpool Gungrog ward on 24 February 2000 following the death of Councillor G.E.H. Taylor.

Newtown and Llanllwchaiarn North by-election 2001
A by-election was held in the Newtown and Llanllwchaiarn North ward on 12 July 2001 following the resignation of Councillor C.J. Arnold.

Rhayader by-election 2001
A by-election was held in the Rhayader ward on 13 September 2001 following the resignation of Councillor Martin Pugh.

Llangors by-election 2002
A by-election was held in the Llangors ward on 17 January 2002 following the resignation of Councillor Roger Williams following his election as MP for Brecon and Radnorshire.

Crickhowell by-election 2002
A by-election was held in the Crickhowell ward on 11 July 2002 following the death of Councillor Tom Probert.

Brecon St Mary by-election 2003
A by-election was held in the Brecon St Mary ward on 30 October 2003 following the death of Councillor Susan Francis.

Dolforwyn by-election 2004
A by-election was held in the Dolforwyn ward on 15 January 2004 following the resignation of Councillor David Edwards.

References

1999
1999 Welsh local elections